Octava Dies is a 25-minute weekly TV magazine show, which broadcasts worldwide since Easter 1998. It is also broadcast by Italian Catholic television channels and by press agencies such as APTN. It is available in English and Italian on the Vatican's website (broadcast every Sunday at 12:30 after the Angelus).

The magazine is part of the Vatican Television Center (CTV) programs, which are transmitted by the national broadcaster of the state of Vatican City. This specific weekly program highlights the activities of Pope Francis and the Holy See. Taped at the Vatican and in other places visited by the Pope in the course of his day-to-day ministry.

Vatican Central Television was first aired in 1983.

References

External links
Octava Dies, Official Webpage 
Live VTC from the Internet - Format MPEG-4
Live VTC from the Internet - Format H.264
Vatican news services official page
Vatican Radio CTV

Television shows about Catholicism
Television in Vatican City